The Gathering is a 2011 album by the American band Arbouretum.  Mojo placed the album at number 27 on its list of "Top 50 albums of 2011" while Uncut placed it at number 49 on its list.

Track listing

 The White Bird 	(Arbouretum) 	7:09
 When Delivery Comes 	(Arbouretum) 	4:22
 Destroying to Save 	(Arbouretum) 	5:07
 The Highwayman 	(Webb) 	4:13
 Waxing Crescents 	(Arbouretum) 	7:48
 The Empty Shell 	(Arbouretum) 	4:33
 Song of the Nile 	(Arbouretum) 	10:37

References

2011 albums